Cospaia is an Italian hamlet (frazione) of the comune of San Giustino in the Province of Perugia, Umbria.

History

The village was an independent republic from 1440 to 1826, when it was divided between the Grand Duchy of Tuscany and the Papal States.

Geography
Cospaia is located in the northern suburbs of San Giustino, by a lake and next to the borders of Umbria with Tuscany. It is 3 km from Sansepolcro (in the Province of Arezzo), 15 from Città di Castello, 42 from Arezzo and 67 from Perugia.

See also
Republic of Senarica
List of historic states of Italy

References

External links

Thayer's Gazetteer
La storia ritrovata: La Repubblica di Cospaia 
Cospaia: storia della repubblica più piccola al mondo 
Flag of Cospaia Republic

Frazioni of the Province of Perugia